Ofelia Malinov (born ) is an Italian volleyball player, playing as a setter.

She is part of the Italy women's national volleyball team. She was born in Italy to Bulgarian parents.

Career
She competed at the 2015 Women's European Volleyball Championship, 2016 FIVB Volleyball World Grand Prix, and the 2017 FIVB Volleyball World Grand Prix. She was selected to play the Italian League All-Star game in 2017.

Awards

Clubs
 2016 Italian Supercup –  Champions, with Imoco Volley Conegliano
 2016–17 Italian Cup (Coppa Italia) –  Champions, with Imoco Volley Conegliano
 2016–17 CEV Champions League –  Runner-Up, with Imoco Volley Conegliano

Individuals
 2018 FIVB World Championship "Best Setter"

References

1996 births
Living people
Italian women's volleyball players
Sportspeople from Bergamo
Italian people of Bulgarian descent
Volleyball players at the 2020 Summer Olympics
Olympic volleyball players of Italy